Artenay is a commune in the Loiret department in north-central France. Artenay station has rail connections to Orléans, Étampes and Paris.

Population

See also
 Communes of the Loiret department

References

Communes of Loiret
Orléanais